Cecilia Blanco (born 23 February 1979 in Madrid, Spain) is a Spanish judoka. She competed in two Summer Olympics: in 2004 in Athens in the 70 kg event where she lost the repechage semifinals to Qin Dongya and in 2012 in London in the 70 kg event where she lost her second match to Raša Sraka. Blanco won three silver medals (2001, 2004, 2011) and one bronze medal (2010) at the European Judo Championships.

References

External links
 
 

1979 births
Living people
Spanish female judoka
Judoka at the 2004 Summer Olympics
Judoka at the 2012 Summer Olympics
Olympic judoka of Spain
Mediterranean Games bronze medalists for Spain
Mediterranean Games medalists in judo
Competitors at the 2001 Mediterranean Games
20th-century Spanish women
21st-century Spanish women